Boardwalk is a 1979 American drama film written by Stephen Verona and Leigh Chapman and directed by Verona. It stars Ruth Gordon, Lee Strasberg and Janet Leigh.

The film is about the Rosen family and their struggle with a gang terrorizing their Coney Island neighborhood.  It was filmed on location at numerous spots in New York city, including the famous but now defunct Dubrow's Cafeteria.

It was written by Leigh Chapman and Verona, who were a couple at the time. Chapman later recalled the film as "Amateurish? boring? Strasberg [was] a dreadful actor… I give V[erona] credit for tenacity... [a] British investor who put up the money for the film. He was one of those “commoner” Brits who created a travel agency and made a lot of money. I don't know how Verona met him or conned him into putting up the money."

Plot

Cast
Ruth Gordon as Becky Rosen
Lee Strasberg as David Rosen
Janet Leigh as Florence Cohen
Joe Silver as Leo Rosen
Eddie Barth as Eli Rosen
Merwin Goldsmith as Charley
Michael Ayr as Peter
Forbesy Russell as Marilyn
Chevi Colton as Vera Rosen
Teri Keane as Betty Rosen
Eli Mintz as Friedman
Rashel Novikoff as Sadie
Lillian Roth as Ruth
Kim Delgado as Strut
 Altovise Davis as Mrs. Bell

References

External links

1979 films
American drama films
1979 drama films
Atlantic Entertainment Group films
Films about old age
Films set in Coney Island
1970s English-language films
1970s American films